On April 2–5, 1957, a significant, deadly tornado outbreak sequence affected the Southern United States. This list details all confirmed tornadoes in this tornado outbreak sequence.

Confirmed tornadoes

In addition to confirmed tornadoes, a possible tornado may have destroyed a home in the Woodlawn community, near Sherman, on April 2. Another possible tornado hit Ballard County, Kentucky, on April 3, unroofing homes, destroying a drive-in theater, and uprooting trees. A loud roaring noise was heard. Another tornado may have also struck near Tansill in Pope County, Illinois, on the same date. Two other brief tornadoes may have hit near Westlake and at Tallulah, Louisiana, late on April 4.

April 2 event

April 3 event

April 4 event

April 5 event

Notes

References

Sources

F4 tornadoes by date
Tornadoes of 1957
Tornadoes in Texas
Tornadoes in Oklahoma
Tornadoes in Mississippi
1957 natural disasters in the United States
Tornado outbreak sequence